Walter Grove may refer to:

Sir Walter John Grove, 2nd Baronet (1852-1932), of the Grove baronets
Sir Walter Felipe Grove, 4th Baronet (1927-1974), of the Grove baronets

See also
Grove (surname)